Alfred E. "Fred" Dehnert (12 May 1928 – 18 August 1983) was a Dutch tennis player. He competed at Wimbledon in 1951–1957, only once advancing through the singles first round.

References

1928 births
1983 deaths
Dutch male tennis players
Sportspeople from Rotterdam